Philip Claeys (born 24 May 1965) is a Belgian Flanders-based politician for the Vlaams Belang.

Claeys was a Member of the European Parliament from 2003 to 2014. He participated in the international counter-jihad conferences in Brussels in 2007 and in 2012. Since late 2010, he was a board member of the eurosceptic party European Alliance for Freedom, which was dissolved in 2016. From 2017 to 2019 he was the secretary-general of the Europe of Nations and Freedom group, and since 2019 he has been secretary of the Identity and Democracy group.

References

External links 
 Personal Website
 
 
 

1965 births
Living people
Counter-jihad activists
Politicians from Ghent
Vlaams Belang MEPs
MEPs for Belgium 1999–2004
MEPs for Belgium 2004–2009
MEPs for Belgium 2009–2014